Tancred Melis (18 February 1934 – 2 May 2013) was a South African cricketer. He played six first-class matches for Orange Free State between 1970 and 1973.

References

External links
 

1934 births
2013 deaths
South African cricketers
Free State cricketers
Cricketers from Kimberley, Northern Cape